The following is a complete list of harpsichord works by Christoph Graupner (1683-1760), the German harpsichordist and composer of high Baroque music.  The works appear as given in Christoph Graupner : Thematisches Verzeichnis der musikalischen Werke (thematic catalogue of Graupner's instrumental works).

List of harpsichord pieces
 GWV 101 — Partita in C major
 GWV 102 — Partita in C minor
 GWV 103 — Partita in D major
 GWV 104 — Partita in D minor
 GWV 105 — Partita in E flat major
 GWV 106 — Partita in E major
 GWV 107 — Partita in E minor
 GWV 108 — Partita in F major
 GWV 109 — Partita in C major "Januarius"
 GWV 110 — Partita in G major "Februarius"
 GWV 111 — Partita in G minor "Martius"
 GWV 112 — Partita in C minor "Aprilis"
 GWV 113 — Partita in F major "Maius"
 GWV 114 — Partita in F minor "Junius"
 GWV 115 — Partita in D major "Julius"
 GWV 116 — Partita in D minor "Augustus"
 GWV 117 — Partita in A major "September"
 GWV 118 — Partita in A minor "October"
 GWV 119 — Partita in E major "November"
 GWV 120 — Partita in E minor "December"
 GWV 121 — Partita in F minor "Vom Winter"
 GWV 122 — Partita for harpsichord "Vom Frühling" (lost)
 GWV 123 — Partita for harpsichord "Vom Sommer" (lost)
 GWV 124 — Partita for harpsichord "Vom Herbst" (lost)
 GWV 125 — Gigue in C major
 GWV 126 — Partita in C major
 GWV 127 — Partita in C major
 GWV 128 — Partita in C major
 GWV 129 — Partita in C major
 GWV 130 — Partita in C major
 GWV 131 — Partita in C minor
 GWV 132 — Partita in C minor
 GWV 133 — Partita in C minor
 GWV 134 — Partita in D major
 GWV 135 — Sonatina in D major
 GWV 136 — Aria in E flat major
 GWV 137 — Partita in E minor
 GWV 138 — Gigue in F major
 GWV 139 — Murky in F major
 GWV 140 — Partita in F major
 GWV 141 — Partita in G major
 GWV 142 — Partita in G major
 GWV 143 — Partita in G major
 GWV 144 — Partita in G major
 GWV 145 — Partita in G major
 GWV 146 — Partita in G major
 GWV 147 — Partita in A major
 GWV 148 — Partita in A major
 GWV 149 — Partita in A major
 GWV 150 — Partita in A minor
 GWV 701 — Partita in D major
 GWV 702 — Partita in D minor
 GWV 703 — Menuet in F minor
 GWV 704 — Partita in G major (fragment)
 GWV 705 — Partita in A minor (fragment)
 GWV 706 — Harpsichord Sonata in B flat major
 GWV 801 — Air in C major
 GWV 802 — Marche du Régiment de Saxe Gotha in C major
 GWV 803 — Menuet in C major
 GWV 804 — Partita in C major
 GWV 805 — Partita in C major
 GWV 806 — Gigue in C minor
 GWV 807 — Menuet in C minor
 GWV 808 — Sarabande in C minor
 GWV 809 — Sonatina in C minor
 GWV 810 — Aria in D major
 GWV 811 — Menuet in D major
 GWV 812 — Menuet in D major
 GWV 813 — Menuet in D major
 GWV 814 — Menuet in D major
 GWV 815 — Menuet in D major
 GWV 816 — Menuet in D major
 GWV 817 — Menuet in D major
 GWV 818 — Menuet in D major
 GWV 819 — Partita in D major
 GWV 820 — Aria in D minor
 GWV 821 — Aria in D minor
 GWV 822 — Aria in D minor
 GWV 823 — Menuet in D minor
 GWV 824 — Partita in D minor
 GWV 825 — Passepied in D minor
 GWV 826 — Prelude & Fugue in D minor
 GWV 827 — Bourrée in E minor
 GWV 828 — Menuet in E minor
 GWV 829 — Partita in E minor
 GWV 830 — Badinage in F major
 GWV 831 — Bourrée in F major
 GWV 832 — Entrée in F major
 GWV 833 — Menuet in F major
 GWV 834 — Menuet in F major
 GWV 835 — Partita in F major
 GWV 836 — Polonoise in F major
 GWV 837 — Polonoise in F major
 GWV 838 — Marche in G major
 GWV 839 — Menuet in G major
 GWV 840 — Menuet in G major
 GWV 841 — Menuet in G major
 GWV 842 — Reveille in G major
 GWV 843 — Piece in G major
 GWV 844 — Piece in G major
 GWV 845 — Piece in G major
 GWV 846 — Menuet in A major
 GWV 847 — Menuet in A major
 GWV 848 — Murky in A major
 GWV 849 — Partita in A major
 GWV 850 — Partita in A major
 GWV 851 — Partita in A major
 GWV 852 — Gigue in A minor
 GWV 853 — Menuet in A minor
 GWV 854 — Menuet in A minor
 GWV 855 — Prelude & Fugue in A minor
 GWV 856 — Bourrée in B flat major
 GWV 857 — Partita in B flat major

See also
 List of cantatas by Christoph Graupner
 List of symphonies by Christoph Graupner
 List of orchestral suites by Christoph Graupner
 List of concertos by Christoph Graupner
 List of chamber pieces by Christoph Graupner

Selected discography
 Graupner: Partitas for harpsichord Vol. 1. Geneviève Soly. (Analekta 3109)
 Graupner: Partitas for harpsichord Vol. 2. Geneviève Soly. (Analekta 3164)
 Graupner: Partitas for harpsichord Vol. 3. Geneviève Soly. (Analekta 3181)
 Graupner: Partitas for harpsichord Vol. 4. Geneviève Soly. (Analekta 9116)
 Graupner: Partitas for harpsichord Vol. 5. Geneviève Soly. (Analekta 9118)
 Graupner: Partitas for harpsichord Vol. 6. Geneviève Soly. (Analekta 9119)
 Graupner: Partitas for harpsichord Vol. 7. Geneviève Soly. (Analekta 9120)

References

External links
Graupner GWV-online a digital Graupner Werkverzeichnis with integrated search function
The Christoph Graupner Society Homepage
Extensive online bibliography for research on Christoph Graupner
ULB Library  Graupner's music manuscripts and archives in Darmstadt, Germany
Kim Patrick Clow's webpage dedicated to promoting Graupner's work.

 Christoph Graupner's works at La Sinfonie d'Orphée

Harpsichord pieces
Graupner, Christoph